Alessio Vinci (born 15 April 1968) is an Italian journalist, working for CNN since 1989. He has served as CNN's bureau chief in Belgrade from 1999 to 2000 and in Rome from 2001 up to the present. He was the host of Matrix, a news and debate television program on Mediaset's Canale 5, from 2009 and 2012.

He received the America Award of the Italy-USA Foundation in 2016.

External links 
 Official profile at CNN.com
 Matrix official website and video gallery

1968 births
Living people
People from Luxembourg City
Italian journalists
Italian male journalists
Television reporters and correspondents
CNN people